Star is an unincorporated community in Mills County in Central Texas. According to the Handbook of Texas, the community had an estimated population of 85 in 2000.

Geography
Star is located at the junction of U.S. Highway 84 and FM 1047 and North Simms Creek in east-central Mills County, east of Goldthwaite and west of Evant. It is located near the Hamilton County line.

Climate
The climate in this area is characterized by relatively high temperatures and evenly distributed precipitation throughout the year. The Köppen Climate System describes the weather as humid subtropical, and uses the abbreviation Cfa.

History
The community was laid out by Alec Street in the mid-1880s and was named for nearby Star Mountain. Street ran a store and a gin in the community. A post office was established in 1886 with Calvin Skinner as its first postmaster. In 1890, the first public road opened from Star to Goldthwaite. By 1895, the community had a saloon, several grocery stores, and a drug store. A tornado struck Star on May 5, 1904. Two people were killed and five homes were completely destroyed. The community recovered and a permanent church was built in 1905. In 1910, a bank opened. A four-room, two-story stone school building was completed in 1913. A hailstorm damaged homes, businesses, and the school on April 22, 1924. Star's bank was robbed in 1928 and the robber got away with about $3,000 and several valuables. Four years later, during the Great Depression, the bank was sold to the Trent State Bank in Goldthwaite. By 1939, Star had eight businesses operating in the community. That same year, three area schools – McGirk, Center City, and Hurst Ranch – consolidated with Star. The population stood at around 170 in the mid-1940s. The rising popularity of the automobile caused a decline in the number of local businesses. By 1980, the community had an estimated population of 85. That figure remained steady through 2000. It went up to 110 in 2010.

Although Star is unincorporated, it does have a post office with the zip code 76880.

Education
The community of Star is served by the Star Independent School District and is home to the Star School Tigers.

Notable person
 James Jeter, actor, was born in Star.

References

Unincorporated communities in Mills County, Texas
Unincorporated communities in Texas